Bootleg is the second album release by UK parody heavy metal group Bad News. It is a comedy album, apparently a bootleg of outtakes from the sessions for the group's debut album Bad News. The first album features music and some arguing between the band members; this album is almost entirely arguing.

Track listing
 "Bad Dreams"
 "A.G.M."
 "Double Entendre"
 "Locked In"
 "AIDS"
 "O Levels"
 "Wedding"
 "Heavy Metal Farmer"
 "Making of Masturbike"
 "Cashing In on Christmas" (DUB)

Bad News (band) albums
1988 live albums
The Comic Strip
EMI Records albums